= Błędnica (Slavic demoness) =

Błędnica [bwɛndˈnit͡sa] – a forest demoness, which is said to have led people astray, leaving its victims alone in the depths of the forest to die of starvation or to be eaten by wild animals. The evil entity is most often described as a young and pretty girl. It is believed that the only way to chase the demon away was to use some strong spells or to sacrifice something either at one's home or during the hunt.
